Black In Neuro is a grassroots initiative that looks to connect, celebrate and amplify Black voices working in neuroscience. In particular, Black in Neuro looked to increase visibility of Black neuroscientists, who face challenges in navigating the majority white world of academia. The group was created as a response to the Black Lives Matter movement and the #BLACKandSTEM initiatives that were inspired worldwide. The inaugural event ran from July 27 – August 2, 2020.

Origins 
In 2014 Danielle N. Lee coined the term #BLACKandSTEM to unite Black scientists and engineers around the world. Guided by both her work and the Black Lives Matter movement that followed the murder of George Floyd and the Central Park birdwatching incident, several #BLACKandSTEM programmes were launched online. The first event, Black Birders Week, took place May 31 – June 5.

Inspired by Black Birders Week, current executive board president, Angeline Dukes, current president-elect Kaela Singleton, and many other Black scientists and allies came together to launch Black in Neuro, a grassroots effort to connect, empower and inspire Black scholars working in disciplines related to neuroscience. According to the Society for Neuroscience, at the time Black in Neuro launched, only 1% of neuroscience faculty in the United States identified as Black. The group called for white and non-Black people of colour to recognise their complicity in anti-Black racism. Black in Neuro primarily made use of social media, specifically Twitter, to amplify stories, share best practice and work to eliminate racism within neurosciences.

Black in Neuro collected and published over three hundred profiles of Black researchers working in neuroscience on www.BlackInNeuro.com. The organisers of Black in Neuro wrote a perspective for The Journal of Neuroscience where they wrote, "as Black trainees, our lab coats, degrees, and accolades are not bulletproof and do absolutely nothing to protect us from systemic racism".

#BlackInNeuroWeek 2020 
The first Black in Neuro week took place in the last week of July 2020, using the hashtag #BlackInNeuro on Twitter and other platforms. Each day involved considered different aspects of scientific life, including representation, education, access, creativity and outreach. The group also worked to celebrate the contributions of Black women to neuroscience. The discussions were recorded and saved on the BlackInNeuro YouTube channel.

The BLACKandSTEM initiatives did not only highlight the research carried out by Black scientists, but also exposed the racism and other challenges that they experienced. The week drew attention from several celebrities, including MC Hammer.

Impact and legacy 
BlackInNeuro Week was supported by over 60 individuals and institutional donors. It was covered by USA Today, Forbes, Raleigh News & Observer, Science News, and CBC News. In 2020 the journal Science, named the #BlackinX movements as a finalist for 2020 Breakthrough of the Year.

Black in Neuro arranged conferences and seminar series as well as a mentorship programme.

References

External links 

 
 

Black Lives Matter
May 2020 events in the United States
Anti-racism in the United States
Awareness weeks
Black in STEM weeks
Neuroscience projects
Neuroscience organizations